DYBN (92.3 FM), broadcasting as Magic 92.3, is a radio station owned and operated by Quest Broadcasting. Its studio and transmitter are located at BSP Camp, Capitol Hills, Brgy. Lahug, Cebu City. The station airs from 6:00 AM to 8:00 PM daily.

The station was formerly known as Killerbee 92.3 from its inception in 1992 until March 27, 2013. This station, along with the other Killerbee stations, were relaunched under the Magic moniker (adopted from its parent station) by April 29, 2013.

References

External links

Radio stations in Metro Cebu
Contemporary hit radio stations in the Philippines
Quest Broadcasting
Radio stations established in 1992
Tiger 22 Media Corporation